Criminal Shadows: Inside the Mind of the Serial Killer is a 1994 book written by English professor of psychology, David V. Canter. It was the winner of two literary awards: the Gold Dagger for Non-Fiction (1994) and the Anthony Award for Best True Crime (1995).

Editions 
The original hardcover edition was published by Hutchinson in 1992 under the title Criminal Shadows: Detecting Rapists and Killers. Under the present title, it was published by HarperCollins as a hardcover in 1994 and as a paperback in 1995. Endeavor Press published the Kindle Edition E-book (ASIN: B019P27WJK) in 2015.

Awards

1994 
CWA Gold Dagger for Non-Fiction

1995 
Anthony Award for Best True Crime

See also 

 FBI method of profiling
 Behavioral Analysis Unit

External links 
 Book review on The Independent
 As listed at the British Library
 As listed at the Library of Congress
 As listed at the University of Lincoln
 As listed at the National Library of Australia

References 

1994 non-fiction books
Forensic psychology
Non-fiction crime books
Anthony Award-winning works